A referendum on equalising the number of seats in Parliament for black and white voters was held in Swaziland on 25 May 1962. The change was part of a draft constitution put forward on 2 March by the British colonial authorities, and was approved by 97% of voters.

Results

References

1962 referendums
1962 in Swaziland
1962